Moose Cove Lake is a lake located in Halifax County, Nova Scotia, approximately  due north of Salmon River Bridge. The lake is located within the Ship Harbour Long Lake Wilderness Area.

Description
Moose Cove Lake has a very irregular shape. The lake can be divided into roughly two halves, which are interconnected by two shallow and narrow passageways.

Western half
Much of the lake is shallow and littered with granite boulders, remnants of the ice age. A small brook on the south end of this lake leads to Moose Cove on Salmon River Inlet, from which the lake gets its name.

Eastern half
It is also fairly shallow, with occasional boulders poking above the surface of the water. This half connects to Oak Lake via a small and very short brook on its south side.

Recreation
This lake is part of the Skull Lake Loop, a water trail organized by Canoe Kayak Nova Scotia. As there is no settlement in the area, the main recreational activity is paddling on the lake. As it is a wilderness area, deer hunting and fishing are also possible, in season. A number of campsites can be found on Moose Cove Lake, along with the many lakes that surround it.

Access

There are no roads that connect directly to Moose Cove Lake. The most common way to access this lake is from the south via Oak Lake, which connects via a  portage to Oyster Pond, where there is an easily accessible boat launch. Another option is to drive down Lays Lake Road, and launch a boat at Rocky Lake. From here, getting to Moose Cove Lake requires three  portages to get to Richardson Lake to the northwest, followed by a  portage to enter Moose Cove Lake itself.

References

Lakes of Nova Scotia